The 2016 NASCAR Whelen Modified Tour was the thirty-second season of the Whelen Modified Tour (WMT). It began with the Icebreaker 150 at Thompson Speedway Motorsports Park on April 10 and concluded with the Sunoco World Series 150 at the same venue on October 16. Doug Coby entered the season as the defending Drivers' Champion and he won the championship for the fourth time, twelve points in front of Justin Bonsignore.
Melissa Fifield, the only female driver to compete in the series in 2016, was voted by the fans as the most popular driver for the third consecutive year.

Drivers

Notes

Schedule
The Whelen All-Star Shootout did not count towards the championship. Nine of the eighteen races in the 2016 season were televised on NBCSN and were on a tape delay basis. The Icebreaker 150 was shown live on FansChoice.tv.

Notes

Results and standings

Races

Notes
1 – There was no qualifying session for the All-Star Shootout. The starting grid was decided with a random draw.
2 – The qualifying session for the F. W. Webb 100 was cancelled due to heavy rain. The starting line-up was decided by Practice results.

Drivers' championship

(key) Bold – Pole position awarded by time. Italics – Pole position set by final practice results or 2015 Owner's points. * – Most laps led.

Notes
‡ – Non-championship round.
1 – Kyle Ellwood qualified in the No. 6 for Ryan Preece.
2 – Johnny Bush and Melissa Fifield received championship points, despite the fact that they did not qualify for the race.
3 – Scored points towards the Whelen Southern Modified Tour.
4 – Jon McKennedy qualified in the No. 6 for Ryan Preece.

See also

2016 NASCAR Sprint Cup Series
2016 NASCAR Xfinity Series
2016 NASCAR Camping World Truck Series
2016 NASCAR K&N Pro Series East
2016 NASCAR K&N Pro Series West
2016 NASCAR Whelen Southern Modified Tour
2016 NASCAR Pinty's Series
2016 NASCAR Whelen Euro Series

References